Opioid agonist treatment may refer to:
Any treatment involving opioid agonists
Opioid Agonist Treatment or OAT, an opioid dependence treatment program performed by CSAT-accredited facilities using opioid agonists